Mobb Boss is a solo album released by Keak Da Sneak on May 18, 2010.

Track listing
Disc 1
 "Mobb Boss" - 0:44
 "Rims On Everything" - 3:18
 "Lights Out" - 4:35
 "One Two Step" - 3:50
 "Talk Is Cheap" - 4:19
 "Pop That Thing" - 4:27
 "After Sex Towel" - 3:22
 "Team Work" - 4:16
 "The Man" - 3:29
 "Go Hard" - 3:10
 "I Stay" feat. San Quinn - 3:31
 "Gone" - 3:27
 "Call Me" - 5:06
 "Outro" - 0:46

References

2010 albums
Keak da Sneak albums